Edward Sinclair (1914–1977) was an English actor

Edward Sinclair may also refer to:

Edward Sinclair (cricketer) (1889–1966), English cricketer and Royal Navy officer
Edward Sinclair (swimmer) (born 1980), British swimmer